The Mount Without was a church now a creative space on St Michael's Hill in Bristol, England, near the University. It has been designated as a grade II* listed building, and was described as being in poor condition and on the Buildings at Risk Register.

The tower dates from the mid 15th century, however the rest of the church was rebuilt between 1775 and 1777 by Thomas Paty
After the building was deconsecrated in 1999 and then burnt down in 2016 its had a complete renovation and now open as a creative space for the city and beyond to use as a unique gathering space, once again.

History

The original church on the site was Norman. As it was outside the original city walls it was known as St Michael on the Mount Without. The tower was added in the 15th century. Bells were installed in the tower in 1739. By the 1760s the population of the city and parish had grown requiring expansion of church. A survey by Thomas Paty described the fabric of the old building as "ruinous" and, as a result demolition of everything except the tower was undertaken and it was rebuilt. It has an aisled nave, chancel and north and south porches, along with the older tower in the west.

It was damaged in 1941 during the Bristol Blitz and the fire caused by incendiary bombs left it without a roof but it was considered repairable.

The church closed in 1999 due to falling attendances and has been boarded up since then. Some walls are covered in ivy and are in shadow from overgrown trees. Various plans have been put forward for the church's future use. The Bristol Civic Society is working with the Diocese of Bristol and others to develop a sustainable use for the future. A bid for Heritage Lottery Fund support has been submitted for the first stage of the work.

There was a tradition at the church of distributing large buns known as Colston buns or Tuppenny Starvers to local children on Easter Tuesday. Since the closure of the church this has been continued at the local primary school.

In October 2016 the building caught fire, with reports of the roof collapsing. Fifteen fire engines from Avon Fire and Rescue Service attended. Avon Fire and Rescue Service said that the fire was started deliberately. In October 2017 the building was put up for sale  and was bought in 2019 by local businessman, Norman Routledge, to restore as a performing arts venue. The venue is expected to open later in 2021.

Archives
Parish records for the church of St Michael on the Mount Without, Bristol are held at Bristol Archives (Ref. P. St M) (online catalogue) including baptism, marriage and burial registers. The archive also includes records of the incumbent, churchwardens, overseer of the poor, parochial church council, charities, schools, societies and vestry plus deeds, plans, photographs and pictures.

See also
 Churches in Bristol
 Grade II* listed buildings in Bristol

References

External links

Saint Michael
Saint Michael
Structures on the Heritage at Risk register
15th-century church buildings in England
Former Church of England church buildings
Saint Michael